Raymond Harry Beckett (1903–1983) was an Australian journalist, newspaper editor and author.

Before becoming a journalist he worked as a rouseabout in South Australia. His first position as a journalist was working for the Adelaide Advertiser where he was paid one penny per line of copy. Other positions he has held include: chief sub-editor at the Sydney Telegraph, Assistant Editor of the Sunday Telegraph and the Sun-Herald and editor of the Sunday Mirror.

Bibliography

References

1903 births
1983 deaths
20th-century Australian journalists